María Pilar Armanet Armanet (born 4 February 1950) is a Chilean politician and lawyer who served as Minister Secretary-General of Government during the first government of Michelle Bachelet (2006–2010).

She was the head of the University of the Americas.

References

External links
 Armanet at Conicyt

1950 births
Living people
Chilean people
Chilean people of French descent
University of Chile alumni
21st-century Chilean politicians
Party for Democracy (Chile) politicians
Chilean Ministers Secretary General of Government
Women government ministers of Chile
Heads of universities in Chile 
Academic staff of the University of the Americas (Chile)